Plum is the fourth studio album by American band Wand. It was released on September 22, 2017 through Drag City Records.

Accolades

Track listing

Personnel
Adapted from AllMusic's Credits section for Plum.

Wand

 Cory Hanson - vocals, guitar 
 Robert Cody - guitar
 Sofia Arreguin - Moog synthesizer, piano, percussion, vocals
 Lee Landey - bass
 Evan Burrows - drums, percussion

References

2017 albums
Drag City (record label) albums
Wand (band) albums